The 15th edition of the Strade Bianche was held on 6 March 2021. Starting and finishing in Siena, Tuscany, Italy, it was the third event of the 2021 UCI World Tour.

Teams
Twenty-five teams participated in the race, including all nineteen UCI WorldTeams and six UCI ProTeams. Each team entered seven riders, for a total of 175 riders. Of these riders, 118 finished, while a further 20 riders finished over the time limit.

UCI WorldTeams

 
 
 
 
 
 
 
 
 
 
 
 
 
 
 
 
 
 
 

UCI ProTeams

Result

References

External links
 

Strade Bianche
Strade Bianche
Strade Bianche
Strade Bianche